The 1968–69 NCAA University Division men's basketball rankings was made up of two human polls, the AP Poll and the Coaches Poll.

Legend

AP Poll 
This was the first season since 1959–60 that AP polls throughout the season included 20 ranked teams.

UPI Poll

References 

1968-69 NCAA Division I men's basketball rankings
College men's basketball rankings in the United States